Card game is a huge genre of games played with playing cards.

Card game may also refer to:
 Card Game (The Price Is Right), a segment game on US TV series "The Price Is Right"
 Card game bridge
 Card game video game
 Card game faro
 Card game cassino
 Card game patience
 Card Game (ballet)